No Good Nick is an American comedy-drama streaming television series, created by David H. Steinberg and Keetgi Kogan. The series stars Siena Agudong, Lauren Lindsey Donzis, Kalama Epstein, Melissa Joan Hart and Sean Astin, and the first part premiered on April 15, 2019, on Netflix. Part two was released on August 5, 2019. In September 2019, it was announced that the series was canceled after two seasons.

Premise
Thirteen-year-old Nicole "Nick" Franzelli was raised by her father Tony who ran the popular Franzelli's restaurant in Portland, Oregon. After Liz Thompson opened her rival Crescendo Restaurant across the street, the Thompson family used dirty tactics to drive Franzelli's out of business. Tony borrowed money from the mob in a desperate effort to keep his restaurant afloat and then went to prison for robbing a convenience store to meet his repayments to the mob. Taken into state care, Nick was placed with corrupt foster parents Sam and Dorothy Harbaugh, who trained her as a con artist.

The series begins as Nick infiltrates the Thompson home under the alias "Nicole Patterson," claiming that her parents recently died in a car crash and the family are her closest living relatives. Under the influence of her father and the Harbaughs, Nick endeavors to steal money and valuables from the Thompsons and wreak revenge on them. However, as she becomes increasingly attached to the family, Nick's loyalties are divided and she struggles to carry out her plan.

Genre 
Reviews note the difficulty in classifying the genre of No Good Nick, citing that, although it casts veteran child stars of Disney, Freeform, and Nickelodeon, the series features themes more attuned to adults such as physical violence and drama.

Cast and characters

Main

 Siena Agudong as Nick, a teenage con artist who is planning to rob the Thompson family and gain revenge on them for ruining her father's business.
 Lauren Lindsey Donzis as Molly, the youngest Thompson child, a student and an environmental activist with a large online following, who frequently stoops to coercive methods to impose her beliefs on those around her. Molly previously used her knowledge of social media to fabricate negative reviews of Franzelli's and hurt the restaurant's rating.
 Kalama Epstein as Jeremy, the eldest Thompson child, an overachieving high-school sophomore who is suspicious of Nick. He previously stole menus that Nick had printed to promote Franzelli's. He later comes out as gay to his family.
 Sean Astin as Ed, the patriarch of the Thompson household and a senior loan officer at Overton Bank, where Tony Franzelli was a longstanding client. Ed previously abused his position to deny Franzelli a loan extension, leading to his borrowing money from the mob.
 Melissa Joan Hart as Liz, the matriarch of the Thompson household, a chef, and owner of the Crescendo Restaurant. She aspires to appear on Top Chef. A ruthless businesswoman, Liz originally has no reservation about crushing rival businesses like Franzelli's, but she regardless still cares very much for her family and did not mean any harm.

Recurring
 Kyla-Drew as Becky, activist and leader of the volunteer squad, Molly's frenemy
 Sanai Victoria as Tamika, member of the volunteer squad
 Tiana Le as Xuan, member of the volunteer squad
 Eddie McClintock as Tony Franzelli, Nick's father. While incarcerated, he has Nick gain revenge on the Thompsons and obtain money so that he can continue to meet his repayments to the mob. For the first half of the series, he lies to Nick telling her the money is paying a lawyer.
 Ted McGinley and Molly Hagan as Sam and Dorothy Harbaugh, Nick's corrupt foster parents. They train their many foster children as con artists and thieves to steal money and valuables on their behalf. Dorothy also poses as a social services coordinator to endorse Nick's credentials.
 Alex Poncio as Jim, Jeremy's friend
 Gus Kamp as Eric, Jeremy's love interest
 Marco Sanchez as Eduardo, an employee of the Crescendo Restaurant
 Lori Mae Hernandez as Riley, Nick's childhood best friend
 Josie Totah as Lisa Haddad, a high-school senior who competes with Jeremy for student council president
 Jerry Trainor as Todd, an accomplice of Nick
 Anthony Turpel as Will, Nick's love interest and a spy for the Harbaughs
 Gavin Lewis as Omar, another of Sam and Dorothy's foster children. Nick uses his image to create a GoFundMe campaign to raise $10,000 for her dad
 Jonathan Silverman as Paul, a worker for the mob boss who Tony owes money.

Guest stars
 Ana Rey as Sheri ("The Catfish")
 Elaine Kao as Ms. Lee ("The Catfish")

Episodes

Production
On September 21, 2018, it was announced that Netflix had given the production a series order for a first season consisting of twenty episodes. The series was created by David H. Steinberg and Keetgi Kogan, both of whom were also expected to executive produce. It was further announced that Andy Fickman would serve as the series' director. On March 6, 2019, Netflix announced that the series is set to release the first 10 episodes on April 15, 2019, and a promotional poster was released.

Alongside the series order announcement, it was confirmed that Melissa Joan Hart, Sean Astin, Siena Agudong, Kalama Epstein, and Lauren Lindsey Donzis had been cast in starring roles.

Principal photography for the series had reportedly already begun by September 2018.

On September 15, 2019, it was announced that the series was canceled after one season.

Reception
On review aggregator Rotten Tomatoes, the series holds an approval rating of 60% based on 5 reviews, with an average rating of 6.5/10. A critic from the Hollywood Gossip writes: "There are plenty of ways that No Good Nick could have made more of its premise, but it never really stumbles on a compelling one."

References

External links
 

2010s American comedy-drama television series
2010s American LGBT-related comedy television series
2010s American LGBT-related drama television series
2019 American television series debuts
2019 American television series endings
English-language Netflix original programming
Television shows set in Portland, Oregon
Television series about teenagers
Gay-related television shows